This is a list of all (former) Member of the European Parliament for the Europe Transparent (ET) 
Source:

Seats in the European Parliament

Alphabetical

Elected members of the European Parliament (from 1979)

European Parliament periods

2004-2009 
 

2 seats:
Paul van Buitenen
Els de Groen-Kouwenhoven

References

Main
Europe Transparent